Saga o Karantaniji, Kralj Samo is a Slovenian novel by . It was first published in 2010.

See also
List of Slovenian novels

References

Slovenian novels
2010 novels